Stone structures, or megaliths, have been erected by humanity for thousands of years. Many of these structures were built around the same time, the 3rd millennium BC.

Some of the better-known ones:

Easter Island
Egyptian Pyramids
Medicine wheels
Stone circle
Stone circle (Iron Age)
Stonehenge
Stone ship

See also:

Petroforms
Rock Art
Inukshuk

Megalithic monuments